WGTB-CD, virtual channel 28 (UHF digital channel 27), is a low-powered, Class A Walk TV-affiliated television station licensed to Charlotte, North Carolina, United States.  It is owned by Victory Christian Center, a charismatic megachurch in Charlotte.  Its transmitter is located northeast of the city.  WordNet also owns a network of gospel music stations fronted by WOGR in Charlotte.  Together, they form the Word of God Broadcasting Network, and operate from studios on the campus of the church's middle school in northwest Charlotte.

History 
The station signed on in November 1996 under the call letters W28AC before acquiring the WGTB-LP call sign a month later. From May 2007 to December 5, 2011, MyNetworkTV affiliate WMYT-TV (channel 55) carried WGTB-LP on its third subchannel. It was also available on Time Warner Charlotte channel 113.  On August 1, 2012, WGTB-LP flash-cut to digital operations, also on channel 28.  While its analog signal was essentially limited to Charlotte itself, its digital signal decently covers most of the North Carolina side of the market. However, it is not carried on any of the area's cable systems. On January 7, 2013, the station changed its call sign to the current WGTB-CD.

Digital channel

Programming 
WGTB-CD airs programming primarily from The Walk TV, along with classic television programs such as The Lone Ranger, Daniel Boone and Bonanza.

External links
WordNet

Television channels and stations established in 1996
1996 establishments in North Carolina
GTB-CD
Religious television stations in the United States
Low-power television stations in the United States